Clytus rhamni is a species of round-necked longhorns belonging to the family Cerambycidae, subfamily Cerambycinae.

Subspecies
Subspecies include:
Clytus rhamni bellieri (Gautier, 1862)
Clytus rhamni rhamni (Germar, 1817)
Clytus rhamni temesiensis (Germar, 1824)

Distribution
This common beetle is present in most of Europe (Albania, Austria, Belarus, Bosnia and Herzegovina, Bulgaria, Croatia, Czech Republic, France, Germany, Greece, Hungary, Italy, Republic of North Macedonia, Moldova, Montenegro, Portugal, Romania, Russia, Serbia, Slovakia, Spain, Switzerland, Ukraine) in the eastern Palearctic realm, Caucasus, North Kazakhstan, Transcaucasia, Turkey, Armenia, Israel, Syria, Iran, and in the Near East.

Habitat
This species occurs almost everywhere, but especially in meadows, in shrubs, in glades of wood, orchards and along paths.

Description
Head, pronotum and elytra are brownish or black. Males show a pronotum relatively fine and simply dotted, while females are coarser dotted.

Elytra are only thinly dotted and more or less glossy. Antennae and legs are red-yellow, but the hind legs are darker. The elytrae are crossed by light yellow stripes, as this beetle imitates, for defensive purposes, like other species of the genus Clytus, the chromatic variety of wasps.

Bicolor tibiae distinguish Clytus rhamni bellieri subspecies. This species is very similar to Clytus arietis.

Biology
Adults can be encountered from May through August, completing their life cycle in two year. These polyphagous beetles develop in dead wood of various deciduous trees. The imagos fly the second year. Larvae mainly feed in the dead wood of small branches of Rhamnus (hence the specific name), Castanea, Quercus, Ficus, Ulmus, Pyrus, Prunus species. The adults are very common flower-visitors.

Bibliography
C. Gautier des Cottes: Genre nouveau de Staphilinien et déscription de nouvelles espèces de coléoptères de Syrie et d'Europe in Annales de la Société entomologique de France 4. Serie, 2. Band, Paris 1862
F. Picard: Faune de France - 20 - Coléoptères - Cerambycidae Paris 1929
 Mulsant: Tribu des Longicornes (suite) in Annales des sciences physiques et naturelles, d'agriculture et d'industrie  Band VII Lyon, Paris 1863
Hüseyin Özdikmen: Turkish Red List categories of Longicorn Beetles (Coleoptera: Cerambycidae) part VIII: subfamily Cerambycinae, Anaglyptini and Clytini. in  Munis Entomology & Zoology Vol 9, No 2, June 2014: 687–712.
Mulsant: Larves des coléoptères in Annales de la Société Linnéenne de Lyon Band 23 Lyon, Paris 1877
Hüseyin Özdikmen, Mohammed Anwar Ali: Four genera and species new for the fauna of Iraque .... in  Munis Entomology & Zoology Vol 12, No 2

References

External links
 M. E. F. Sláma CERAMBYCIDAE

Clytini
Beetles of Asia
Beetles of Europe
Beetles described in 1817
Taxa named by Ernst Friedrich Germar